The California Golden Bears men's basketball team is the college basketball team of the University of California, Berkeley.  The program has seen success throughout the years, culminating in a national championship in 1959 under coach Pete Newell, and the team has reached the final four two other times, in 1946 and 1960.

The team plays its home games at Haas Pavilion, which was long known as Harmon Gym before being heavily renovated with money donated in part by the owners of Levi Strauss & Co. The arena was originally known as Men's Gymnasium and then later Harmon Gymnasium until the late 1990s when it went through renovations which displaced the team for two seasons.

History

The Golden Bears first played basketball intercollegiately in 1907 and began full conference play in 1915. The 1920s was the dominant decade for Cal basketball, as the Bears won 6 conference titles under coaches E.H. Wright and Nibs Price. Cal was retroactively recognized as the pre-NCAA tournament national champion for the 1926–27 season by the Premo-Porretta Power Poll.

Nibs Price would coach Cal with great success for 30 years from 1924 to 1954, earning a 449–294 total record, many single season winning records, and an additional 3 conference titles in the 1930s and 1940s.

Cal reached the pinnacle of the sport during the tenure of Pete Newell, who was head coach from 1955 to 1960. The Golden Bears earned the conference title four out of his five years and in 1959, won the NCAA title. In Newell's last year, Cal came close to another NCAA title, but lost to Ohio State in the final.

The fortunes of Cal men's basketball would never be the same after Newell. The next quarter-century would mostly be a dreary one for the program, despite having players such as Butch Hays (1981–1984) and Kevin Johnson (1983–1987) who would both set school records for assists. From 1960 to 1985, the Bears tallied only two winning seasons in conference play. Lou Campanelli served as head coach from 1986–1993. The highlight of this era was a 75–67 victory over UCLA in 1986 that ended a 25-year, 52 game losing streak to the Bruins. Campanelli in his first season took the Golden Bears to the 1986 National Invitation Tournament, the first post season appearance of any sort since 1960.  In 1990, Campanelli led the Golden Bears to their first NCAA Tournament in 30 years.

Cal achieved much better success in the 1990s, qualifying for the NCAA tournament five times with future NBA players Jason Kidd (the Golden Bears all-time assists leader) and Lamond Murray, as well as future perennial All-Pro NFL tight end Tony Gonzalez in the early and mid 1990s and Sean Lampley and Shareef Abdur-Rahim in the late 1990s. Cal also won the 1999 National Invitation Tournament, with a thrilling 61–60 victory over Clemson in the title game.

This success came amid a brief period of turmoil in the mid-1990s. Campanelli was fired midway through the 1992–93 season after athletic director Bob Bockrath heard Campanelli berate his players with obscenity-laden tirades following two losses. Assistant Todd Bozeman finished out the season, and was named permanent head coach after leading the Bears to an upset of two-time defending champion Duke in the NCAA Tournament. Bozeman himself was pushed out two months before the 1996–97 season after it emerged that he'd funneled $30,000 over two years to the parents of star recruit Jelani Gardner so they could make the drive to see their son play. Ultimately, the Bears were docked four scholarships over two years and forfeited the entire 1994–95 season and all but one game of the 1995–96 season.

In 2006, the Golden Bears reached their first Pacific Life Pac-10 Men's Basketball Tournament championship game. Power forward Leon Powe grabbed a tournament-record 20 rebounds against USC in the first round and then scored a tournament-record 41 points in a double-overtime victory versus Oregon in the semi-finals. Despite California's 71–52 loss to UCLA in the final game, Powe was named Most Valuable Player for the tournament.

Ben Braun took over for Bozeman just before the 1996–97 season. Inheriting a team expected to be barely competitive in the Pac-10, Braun led the Bears to a second-place finish and took them all the way to the Sweet 16. During Braun's 12-year tenure, Cal qualified for the NCAA tournament three straight times in the 2000s and six times overall. However, after finishing near the bottom of the Pac-10 for the second straight year, Braun was dismissed in late March 2008. The former coach of rival Stanford, Mike Montgomery, succeeded Braun. In his first year the Bears finished tied for third in the Pac-10 and made it to the NCAA tournament, where they were eliminated in the first round to the Maryland Terrapins.

In Montgomery's second season, the Bears won their first conference title in 50 years. The team, featuring four seniors as starters, only lost one game at Haas Pavilion but had a rough non-conference schedule featuring losses to elite teams such as Kansas, Ohio State, and Syracuse, which quickly knocked them out of the national rankings after being ranked #13 in the pre-season. Despite losing the Pac-10 tournament, and questions on whether even the conference champion of a down Pac-10 conference would receive an at-large bid to the tournament, the Bears qualified for their second straight NCAA bid as a #8 seed. They were able to one-up their previous season by winning their first round matchup against the Louisville Cardinals but fell to the eventual national champions, Duke, in the second round. Senior Jerome Randle finished the season and his career as Cal's all-time leading scorer. The highlight of Montgomery's last season as the head coach for Cal was the signature win at home against then undefeated, No. 1 Arizona. In thrilling fashion, senior guard Justin Cobbs hits the game-winning jumper with 0.9 on the clock for a 60–58 victory.

Mike Montgomery announced his retirement shortly after the 2013–14 season's culmination, resulting in the hiring of Cuonzo Martin. The Bears went 18–15 in Martin's first season as head coach.  On April 13, 2015, 5-star power forward Ivan Rabb of Bishop O'Dowd High School announced he would be attending Cal. A little more than 2 weeks later, 5-star small forward Jaylen Brown announced he too would attend Cal, making this recruiting class the best in Cal history. While the team had a solid regular season, earning a #4 seed in the NCAA tournament, they would be upset in the first round by Hawaii.  After three seasons, Martin announced his resignation to become the head coach at Missouri.  Shortly thereafter, Martin's assistant coach Wyking Jones became Cal's 17th head basketball coach. Jones coached for only two years, with the team finishing in the last place of the Pac-12 during both seasons.  Former Georgia head coach  Mark Fox was named Cal's 18th head basketball coach in 2019.

Coaches

Postseason

NCAA tournament results
The Golden Bears have appeared in 19 NCAA Tournaments. They were national champions in 1959 and their combined record is 20–19.

NIT results
The Golden Bears have appeared in nine National Invitation Tournaments (NIT). Their combined record is 14–8. They were NIT champions in 1999.

 Conference rules (PCC/Pac-8) disallowed participation until 1973.

Notable players

Retired numbers

All-Americans

Golden Bears in international leagues

 Butch Hays, after being drafted by the Chicago Bulls of the NBA played in the National Basketball League (Australia) from 1991–2003
 Shahar Gordon, Played in the Israel Basketball Premier League and for the Israeli national basketball team

Golden Bears notable in other fields
 Tony Gonzalez, Pro Football Hall of Fame tight end for the Kansas City Chiefs and Atlanta Falcons, played forward from 1994–97

References

External links
 

 
Basketball teams established in 1920
1920 establishments in California